Tetra or the Tetra Werke (Company) is a fish food manufacturing company founded by a young German scientist, Dr. Ulrich Baensch.

History and profile
In the 1950s, there were only about 50,000 fish keepers in Germany and the hobby was, at the time, considered as traditionally very time-consuming, rare, difficult and complicated because it required routine collection of live food from streams and river beds, until the invention of dried flake food (Tetramin) for tropical fish by Dr. Ulrich Baensch.  Baensch's Tetramin fish food consisted of four different type of flakes and vitamins.  The brand name Tetramin was derived from the Greek word Tetra (meaning four) and the third syllable of the word vitamin.

The Tetra group employs over 700 colleagues, has representatives in more than 90 countries worldwide and is the largest manufacturer of aquaristic and pond products in the world. Apart from pet food, Tetra supplies fish keepers and pond owners with other products such as water conditioners, plant conditioners, technical equipment and medicinal products.
It was once a part of Warner-Lambert and was later acquired by Pfizer.
In December 2002, Pfizer sold the Tetra aquaristic and pond business to the "Triton Fund", a private independent European investment fund.  Investors in the Triton Fund include European insurances and banks as well as significant American institutions. The Triton Fund paid $238.5 million US for the Tetra business. Three years later, on April 29, 2005, Tetra Holding GmbH was acquired by Spectrum Brands, a global consumer products company.

Tetra Company in the news

Criticisms
The Tetra Company was heavily criticized by the marine fishkeeping community after its appearance on Good Morning America in which it claimed that one of its kits, a 10-gallon (37.3 liters) aquarium and filter, could support the fish from Finding Nemo (a Regal Tang and Ocellaris Clownfish). Most hobbyists pointed out that the Tang alone needs a much larger aquarium (at least 4' in length) and that it would die in such conditions.  However, a 10-gallon saltwater aquarium could successfully house an Ocellaris Clownfish (without the Tang).

See also
Fish food

References

Footnotes

Bibliography
"Stock Up on Rumors At Warner-Lambert", New York Times, February 10, 1996, Saturday, by REUTERS (NYT), Business/Financial Desk, Late Edition-Final, Section 2, Page 50, Column 3, 257 words
"Tetra Plans Pond Support in 2005" and "TetraCare website feature" article from Water Garden News Magazine, August 5, 2004
"Spectrum Brands Acquires Jungle Labs", Water Garden News Magazine, September 2, 2005

Animal food manufacturers
Fish food brands
Fishkeeping
Multinational companies headquartered in Germany
Companies based in Lower Saxony
Manufacturing companies established in 1951
Companies that filed for Chapter 11 bankruptcy in 2009
1951 establishments in West Germany
German companies established in 1951